Weening is a surname. Notable people with the surname or a variant of it include:

Elisabeth Veening, Dutch curler
Pieter Weening (born 1981), Dutch cyclist
Wayne Weening (born 1965), Australian darts player

See also
Weaning, a diet process to give an infant human or another mammal other kinds of suitable food while withdrawing mother's milk
In medicine, weaning is the term used when the medical team is trying to encourage a patient on cardiopulmonary bypass or a mechanical ventilator, or some other less-invasive assistive device, to breathe on their own, unaided, which can take some time and may not always work.